The 2017 Food City 500 was a Monster Energy NASCAR Cup Series race that was scheduled for April 23, 2017, but was postponed until April 24, 2017 due to rain at Bristol Motor Speedway in Bristol, Tennessee. Contested over 500 laps on the  concrete short track, it was the eighth race of the 2017 Monster Energy NASCAR Cup Series season.

Report

Background

Bristol Motor Speedway, formerly known as Bristol International Raceway and Bristol Raceway, is a NASCAR short track venue located in Bristol, Tennessee. Constructed in 1960, it held its first NASCAR race on July 30, 1961. Despite its short length, Bristol is among the most popular tracks on the NASCAR schedule because of its distinct features, which include extraordinarily steep banking, an all concrete surface, two pit roads, and stadium-like seating.

Entry list

First practice

Qualifying
Qualifying for Friday was cancelled due to rain and Kyle Larson, the point leader, was awarded the pole as a result.

Starting Lineup

Practice (post-qualifying)

Second practice

Final practice

Race

First stage
The race was scheduled to be held on Sunday, April 23, but rain delayed it to Monday, April 24.

Kyle Larson led the field to the green flag at 1:11 p.m. The first caution flew on lap 54 when Kurt Busch bounced off Trevor Bayne exiting Turn 4, slid down the front stretch and hit the inside wall. Chris Buescher slammed into the back of Reed Sorenson while slowing down to avoid Busch. Buescher went on to finish last. This brought out the red flag for five minutes and 10 seconds to facilitate cleanup in Turns 1 and 2.

The race restarted on lap 71. It remained green the remainder of the stage, that was won by Larson, and went back under caution on lap 125 for the end of the stage.

Second stage
The race restarted on lap 137. Martin Truex Jr. passed Larson in Turn 2 to take the lead on lap 202. The third caution flew on lap 210 when Kyle Busch suffered a right-front tire blowout and slammed the wall in Turn 2.

The race restarted on lap 217 and the fourth caution flew the same lap when Dale Earnhardt Jr. suffered a right-front tire failure and slammed the wall in Turn 1. “We broke something in the oil system and oil got onto the tires,” Earnhardt told USA TODAY Sports. “We got into the wall.” He added that his crew "said there was some oil in the pit stall after our pit stop. I noticed when I was getting lined up double file for the restart the car was smoking. I just thought maybe we had a tire rub for some reason, but I couldn’t remember what might have caused that. And went into Turn 1 on the restart and the car went straight into the wall with oil all over the tires. Came into the garage there and they are working on where the hole in the system is. Just something is messed up, but that is going to be the finish for us."

The race restarted on lap 228. Truex won the second stage and the fifth caution flew for the conclusion of the stage. Landon Cassill opted not to pit and assumed the lead.

Final stage

The race restarted on lap 260 and Truex passed Cassill with ease exiting Turn 2 to retake the lead. David Ragan attempted to pass through the middle of teammate Cassill on top and Danica Patrick on the bottom exiting Turn 2 on lap 323, but Patrick hit him and sent them both spinning into the backstretch wall, bringing out the sixth caution.

The race restarted on lap 329 and Joey Logano, restarting on the outside line, took the lead from Truex on the restart. The seventh caution flew with 116 laps to go when Busch suffered another right-front tire blowout and slammed the wall in Turn 3.

The race restarted with 110 to go. Jimmie Johnson made contact with Logano as he took the lead with 106 to go. The eighth caution flew with 80 to go when Erik Jones made contact with Gray Gaulding, cut his right-front tire and slammed the wall in Turn 3. A. J. Allmendinger clipped Jones's left-rear corner while trying to avoid him. Denny Hamlin assumed the lead by taking just 2 left side tires only. Larson restarted from the tail-end of the field for speeding on pit road.

The race restarted with 73 to go. Johnson took back the lead with 67 to go. The ninth caution flew with 37 to go when Kasey Kahne hit the wall in Turn 3 and was rear-ended by Paul Menard. Kevin Harvick took the lead by not pitting along with Hamlin who also did not pit. Truex exited pit road first and would've restarted third, but restarted from the tail-end of the field after he was busted for speeding on pit road.

The race restarted with 32 to go. Harvick held off challenges for his lead at first, but his old tires were no match for Johnson's four fresh tires and lost the lead to Johnson with 21 to go. Johnson drove on to score the victory.

Post-race

Driver comments
“Yeah, it was kind of interesting because when the No. 42 (Kyle Larson) was there, it just created an environment to run the top and I wasn't as good on the top,” Johnson said in victory lane. “The No. 42, not being up there and that first couple of cars; the bottom was really where it was at for the short run. This Lowe’s Chevrolet was flying! This track has been difficult over the years and we really hit on something Saturday afternoon in that last practice session around the bottom and honestly, it's what I’ve been looking for here for 16 years and we finally figured it out. So, I'm very, very happy.”

Clint Bowyer, who finished second, said of the final pit stop that he believed "the 48 (of Johnson) was the other one (to take four tires) and he won the race, so the right strategy was there. The team effort was there. You know, that's what a weekend is all about. It's just been this long since I've won a race and here is pretty special. It would have been pretty cool to be over there in Victory Lane."

Race results

Stage results

Stage 1
Laps: 125

Stage 2
Laps: 125

Final stage results

Stage 3
Laps: 250

Race statistics
 Lead changes: 7 among different drivers
 Cautions/Laps: 9 for 76
 Red flags: 1 for 5 minutes and 10 seconds
 Time of race: 3 hours, 4 minutes and 29 seconds
 Average speed:

Media

Television
Fox Sports covered their 17th race at the Bristol Motor Speedway. Mike Joy, five-time Bristol winner Jeff Gordon and 12-time Bristol winner – and all-time Bristol race winner – Darrell Waltrip had the call in the booth for the race. Jamie Little, Chris Neville, Vince Welch and Matt Yocum handled the pit road duties for the television side.

Radio
PRN had the radio call for the race which was also be simulcasted on Sirius XM NASCAR Radio. Doug Rice, Mark Garrow and Wendy Venturini called the race in the booth when the field was racing down the frontstretch. Rob Albright called the race from atop the turn 3 suites when the field raced down the backstretch. Brad Gillie, Brett Mcmillan, Jim Noble, and Steve Richards covered the action on pit lane.

Standings after the race

Drivers' Championship standings

Manufacturers' Championship standings

Note: Only the first 16 positions are included for the driver standings.
. – Driver has clinched a position in the Monster Energy NASCAR Cup Series playoffs.

References

Food City 500
Food City 500
Food City 500
NASCAR races at Bristol Motor Speedway